The 1964 Winter Universiade, the III Winter Universiade, took place in Špindlerův Mlýn, Czechoslovakia.

Medal table

Medalists

Alpine skiing 
Men: Slalom 
Gold – Fritz Wagnerberger (West Germany) 
Silver – Yoshiharu Fukuhara (Japan) 
Bronze – Taliy Monastyrev (Soviet Union)

Men: Giant slalom 
Gold – Jerzy Wojna (Poland) 
Silver – Hajima Tomii (Japan) 
Bronze – Fritz Wagnerberger (West Germany)

Men: Downhill 
Gold – Fritz Wagnerberger (West Germany) 
Silver – Günther Scheuerl (West Germany) 
Bronze – Manfred Kostinger (Austria)

Men: Combined 
Combined event is the overall standings of all disciplines on the Universiade program. 
Gold – Fritz Wagnerberger (West Germany) 
Silver – Günther Scheuerl (West Germany) 
Bronze – Jerzy Wojna (Poland)

Women: Slalom 
Gold – Annie Famose (France) 
Silver – Pascale Judet (France) 
Bronze – Heidi Obrecht (Switzerland)

Women: Giant slalom 
Gold – Hiltrud Rohrbach (Austria) 
Silver – Heidi Obrecht (Switzerland) 
Bronze – Cécile Prince (France)

Women: Downhill 
Gold – Annie Famose (France) 
Silver – Hiltrud Rohrbach (Austria) 
Bronze – Pascale Judet (France)

Women: Combined 
Combined event is the overall standings of all disciplines on the Universiade program. 
Gold – Heidi Obrecht (Switzerland) 
Silver – Hiltrud Rohrbach (Austria) 
Bronze – Ilona Miclos (Romania)

Nordic skiing 
Men: 15 km classical 
Gold – Igor Vorongichin (Soviet Union) 
Silver – Valery Tarakanov (Soviet Union) 
Bronze – Nikolay Arzilov (Soviet Union)

Women: 5 km 
Gold – Nina Demina (Soviet Union) 
Silver – Krastana Stoeva (Bulgaria) 
Bronze – Weronika Budna (Poland)

Nordic combined 
Small hill ski jumping and 15km cross-country

Men: 
Gold – Vyacheslav Dryagin (Soviet Union) 
Silver – Stefan Oleksak (Czechoslovakia) 
Bronze – Takashi Fujisawa (Japan)

 Ski jumping Men: Small Hill - K90 
Gold – Baldur Preiml (Austria) 
Silver – Yuriy Zubarev (Soviet Union) 
Bronze – Andrzej Szfolt (Poland)

 Figure skating Men: 
Gold – Karol Divín (Czechoslovakia) 
Silver – Nobuo Sato (Japan) 
Bronze – Valeriy Meshkov (Soviet Union)Women: 
Gold – Miwa Fukuhara (Japan) 
Silver – Junko Ueno (Japan) 
Bronze – Helli Sengstschmid (Austria)Ice dancing:''' 
Gold – György Korda / Pál Vásárhelyi (Hungary) 
Silver – Jutta Peters / Wolfgang Kunz (West Germany) 
Bronze – Irena Spatenková / Michal Jiránek (Czechoslovakia)

References

1964
U
U
Winter Universiade
Multi-sport events in Czechoslovakia
Sport in Hradec Králové Region
Winter Universiade
Winter sports competitions in Czechoslovakia